Torbjørn Hansen (born 13 August 1972, in Bergen) is a Norwegian politician representing the Conservative Party (Høyre). He is currently a representative of Hordaland in the Storting and was first elected in 2001.

Storting committees
2001–2005 member of the Finance committee.
2005–2009 member of the Business committee.

External links

 Bergen Høyre
 Bergen municipality

1972 births
Living people
Conservative Party (Norway) politicians
Members of the Storting
21st-century Norwegian politicians